Montenegro debuted at the Junior Eurovision Song Contest 2014 that was held in Marsa, Malta.

Formerly Montenegro participated at the Junior Eurovision Song Contest 2005 as part of Serbia and Montenegro. Then the country was represented by Filip Vučić from Nikšić, Montenegro.

History

Prior to the Montenegrin independence referendum in 2006 which culminated into the dissolution of Serbia and Montenegro, both nations use to compete at the Junior Eurovision Song Contest and Eurovision Song Contest as Serbia and Montenegro.  were the first of the two nations to compete at a Junior Contest, making their debut at the Junior Eurovision Song Contest 2006. While it was at the Junior Eurovision Song Contest 2014 when Montenegro would make their debut as an independent nation. Montenegro would eventually withdraw in the Junior Eurovision Song Contest 2016 after participating for two years straight.

Participation overview 

This was the only time they competed before they dissolved.

Commentators and spokespersons

The contests are broadcast online worldwide through the official Junior Eurovision Song Contest website junioreurovision.tv and YouTube. In 2015, the online broadcasts featured commentary in English by junioreurovision.tv editor Luke Fisher and 2011 Bulgarian Junior Eurovision Song Contest entrant Ivan Ivanov. The Montenegrin broadcaster, RTCG, sent their own commentators to each contest in order to provide commentary in the Montenegrin language. Spokespersons were also chosen by the national broadcaster in order to announce the awarding points from Montenegro. The table below list the details of each commentator and spokesperson since 2014.

See also
Montenegro in the Eurovision Song Contest – Senior version of the Junior Eurovision Song Contest.
Sandžak in the Turkvision Song Contest – A historical geo-political region, now divided by the border between Serbia and Montenegro, which competes under the name Sandžak in a contest for countries and regions which are of Turkic-speaking or Turkic ethnicity.

References 

Countries in the Junior Eurovision Song Contest